Holly is a village in north Oakland County in the U.S. state of Michigan. The population was 5,997 at the 2020 census. The village is located within Holly Township.

Geography

Demographics

2020 census 
As of the census of 2020, There were 5,997 people, 2,845 households, and 1514 families living in the village. The population density was 2,118.3 inhabitants per square mile (817.9/km2). The racial makeup of the village was 91.0% White, 1.8% African American, 0.2% Native American, 0% Asian, and 5.9% from two or more races. Hispanic or Latino of any race were 2.6% of the population.

There were 2,845 households, of which 18.7% had children under the age of 18 living with them, 36.6% were married couples living together, 13.7% had a female householder with no husband present, 2.9% had a male householder with no wife present, and 46.8% of all households were made up of individuals. The average household size was 2.09 and the average family size was 2.78.

The median age of the village was 44.4 years. 38.3% of the residents were under 18; 11.9% were between the ages of 18 and 24; 34.5% were from 25 to 44; and 17.5% were 65 years of age or older. The gender makeup of the village was 48.2% male and 51.8% female.

2010 census
As of the census of 2010, there were 6,086 people, 2,453 households, and 1,538 families living in the village. The racial makeup of the village was 95.0% White, 1.2% African American, 0.6% Native American, 0.6% Asian, 0.8% from other races, and 1.9% from two or more races. Hispanic or Latino of any race were 3.6% of the population.

There were 2,453 households, of which 34.5% had children under the age of 18 living with them, 43.7% were married couples living together, 13.1% had a female householder with no husband present, 5.9% had a male householder with no wife present, and 37.3% were non-families. 30.9% of all households were made up of individuals, and 12.9% had someone living alone who was 65 years of age or older. The average household size was 2.45 and the average family size was 3.09.

The median age in the village was 36.3 years. 25.5% of residents were under the age of 18; 8.2% were between the ages of 18 and 24; 28.8% were from 25 to 44; 24.9% were from 45 to 64; and 12.5% were 65 years of age or older. The gender makeup of the village was 48.7% male and 51.3% female.

2000 census
As of the census of 2000, there were 6,135 people, 2,412 households, and 1,565 families living in the village. The racial makeup of the village was 95.14% White, 1.29% African American, 0.44% Native American, 0.41% Asian, 0.02% Pacific Islander, 1.01% from other races, and 1.70% from two or more races. Hispanic or Latino of any race were 3.31% of the population.

There were 2,412 households, out of which 34.7% had children under the age of 18 living with them, 48.5% were married couples living together, 11.2% had a female householder with no husband present, and 35.1% were non-families. 28.7% of all households were made up of individuals, and 12.2% had someone living alone who was 65 years of age or older.  The average household size was 2.49 and the average family size was 3.10.

In the village, the population was spread out, with 27.0% under the age of 18, 8.3% from 18 to 24, 35.6% from 25 to 44, 17.8% from 45 to 64, and 11.3% who were 65 years of age or older.  The median age was 33 years. For every 100 females, there were 96.4 males.  For every 100 females age 18 and over, there were 93.0 males.

The median income for a household in the village was $46,436, and the median income for a family was $54,344. Males had a median income of $42,037 versus $27,078 for females. The per capita income for the village was $19,988.  About 4.3% of families and 7.3% of the population were below the poverty line, including 6.3% of those under age 18 and 14.3% of those age 65 or over.

Tourism 
Holly is the site of the Annual Holly Dickens Festival, as well as the Michigan Renaissance Festival, which was the main shooting location for the romantic comedy film All's Faire in Love (2009).

Holly is the starting point of the Shiawassee River Heritage Water Trail at WaterWorks Park.

The ski area has 19 trails with a range of difficulty, and a high-speed quad chairlift. Nearby is the state owned Holly Recreation Area.

Crapo Park, named after Michigan Governor Henry H. Crapo (1804–1869), located near the junction of the CSX Saginaw Subdivision and Canadian National Railway's Holly Subdivision, is a popular viewing location for railfans. Both lines were formerly served by Holly's small (now abandoned) Holly Union Depot, built in 1886. A nonprofit group is currently attempting to restore the neglected building to its former glory.

The town of Holly was featured as a campaign stop in the Clint Eastwood political action thriller film In The Line Of Fire (1993).

News and media 
Holly is served by the Tri-County Times for print news, and the Oakland County Times for online news.

Notable people 
 James E. Church, Jr., who developed the Mount Rose snow sampler.
 Karl W. Richter, Vietnam War Air Force pilot who, at 23, became the youngest pilot in that conflict to shoot down a MiG in air-to-air combat, and awarded numerous medals for valor including the Air Force Cross, Distinguished Flying Cross and Purple Heart.
 Andrew Anderson, professional ten-pin bowler
 Elissa Slotkin, Congresswoman for Michigan's 8th congressional district, resides in Holly.

Gallery

References

External links 

 Village of Holly
 Holly Township
 Village council
 Holly Downtown Development Authority
 Holly Area Chamber of Commerce

Villages in Oakland County, Michigan
Villages in Michigan
Metro Detroit
Populated places established in 1982
1982 establishments in Michigan